Rodach is a river of Bavaria, Germany. It is a right tributary of the Main, which it joins near Hochstadt am Main. Its largest tributaries are the Wilde Rodach, Haßlach and Steinach.

See also
List of rivers of Bavaria

References

Rivers of Bavaria
Lichtenfels (district)
Rivers of Germany